Mouhcine Outalha (born 15 December 1998) is a Moroccan long-distance runner. He competed in the men's race at the 2020 World Athletics Half Marathon Championships held in Gdynia, Poland.

Career 

He competed in the junior men's race at the 2017 IAAF World Cross Country Championships held in Kampala, Uganda.

In 2019, he represented Morocco at the African Games held in Rabat, Morocco. He competed in the men's 5000 metres and he finished in 13th place.

Achievements

References

External links 
 

Living people
1998 births
Place of birth missing (living people)
Moroccan male long-distance runners
Athletes (track and field) at the 2019 African Games
African Games competitors for Morocco
Athletes (track and field) at the 2022 Mediterranean Games
Mediterranean Games gold medalists for Morocco
20th-century Moroccan people
21st-century Moroccan people
Mediterranean Games gold medalists in athletics
Islamic Solidarity Games competitors for Morocco